HMS Brecon was a  that served with the Royal Navy. Her pennant number was M29.

Service
Brecon was built at Vosper Thornycroft, the lead yard for the Hunt class. She was launched by the Duchess of Kent and commissioned on 18 December 1979. She saw service in the aftermath of the Falklands War (1982) and the Gulf War of 1991. In 1998 she was assigned to the Northern Ireland Squadron. She acted as guardship to the tall ships race when it visited Greenock in 1999.

Brecon was the first Royal Navy vessel to be commanded by a woman. Lieutenant Charlotte "Charlie"  Atkinson became her commanding officer in January 2004. Atkinson was the only woman among the 45-strong crew of the ship. Her historic appointment came 14 years after the Royal Navy first began admitting female officers on equal terms with men.  

Brecons assignment to the Northern Ireland Squadron required modifications from her traditional minesweeping duties to become a fully capable patrol platform. This included the addition of rigid-hulled inflatable boats and embarkation of a 10-strong Royal Marine boarding team.

Decommissioning and new role
Brecon was scheduled to be decommissioned following defence cuts announced in 2004 by the British Ministry of Defence. The ship's company held a last divisions and decommissioning ceremony on 19 July 2005.

In February 2008, Brecon was taken in hand for use as a static training ship at Jupiter Point , where she is utilised to provide new recruits with their first taste of life aboard a Royal Navy ship.

References

External links

 

Hunt-class mine countermeasures vessels
1978 ships